Daniel Gaudiello (born 1982) is an Australian ballet dancer. He performed with The Australian Ballet from 2004 until his retirement as a principal artist in March 2016 to dance and teach as a freelancer.

Dance career
Daniel Gaudiello began dance lessons aged six, studying at the Johnny Young Talent School and the Promenade Dance Studio in Brisbane. He then attended The Australian Ballet School during which time he was an exchange student with the National Ballet School of Canada and the School of American Ballet. He joined The Australian Ballet in 2004 and was promoted to soloist in 2007. He was promoted to principal artist in 2010, at the same time as his wife Lana Jones.

He won the Telstra Ballet Dancer Award for 2007 and was guest artist with the English National Ballet for performances of Le Spectre de la Rose in London and Barcelona, 2009.

Since leaving The Australian Ballet, Gaudiello has performed as guest artist with the Royal New Zealand Ballet, dancing Count Albrecht in Giselle in 2016 and Don José in Carmen in 2017.

Selected repertoire

 Des Grieux and Lescaut in Kenneth MacMillan's Manon, 2014 and 2008
 Petrouchka in Petrouchka, 2009
 Franz in Coppélia, 2010
 Basilio in Don Quixote, 2010
 Camille in Ronald Hynd's The Merry Widow, 2011
 Romeo and Mercutio in Graeme Murphy's Romeo and Juliet, 2011
 Red Knight in Ninette de Valois' Checkmate, 2011
 Lensky in John Cranko's Onegin, 2012
 Albrecht in Giselle, Queensland Ballet, 2013
 The Prince in Alexei Ratmansky's Cinderella, 2013
 Prince Désiré in David McAllister's Sleeping Beauty, 2015

Choreography
 Tristan and Isolde for Bodytorque.Muses, 2011
 South of Eden for Bodytorque.a la Mode, 2010

Awards

 Australian Dance Awards, Outstanding Performance by a Male Dancer, 2011 for Franz in Coppelia
 Telstra Ballet Dancer Award, 2007

References

Australian male ballet dancers
Dancers of the Australian Ballet
Living people
People from Brisbane
Telstra Ballet Dancer Award winners
1982 births